Jesús Marzan was a Filipino basketball player. He competed in the men's tournament at the 1936 Summer Olympics.

References

External links
 

Year of birth missing
Year of death missing
People from Sampaloc, Manila
Philippines men's national basketball team players
Filipino men's basketball players
Olympic basketball players of the Philippines
Basketball players at the 1936 Summer Olympics
Place of birth missing